Miss Robin Crusoe is a 1953 American low-budget adventure film produced and directed by Eugene Frenke and starring Amanda Blake, George Nader and Rosalind Hayes. One of many film variations of Daniel Defoe's 1719 novel Robinson Crusoe, it features a female castaway.

Plot
On September 28, 1659, a ship founders. The captain's daughter and cabin boy named Robin Crusoe and a sailor named Sykes reach a deserted island. When Sykes tries to force Robin to show her appreciation for his efforts, she flees up a hill. In the ensuing struggle, he falls over a cliff and is killed.

She soon settles in, building herself a tree house. She explores the rest of the island.

One day, a group of savages shows up with two women captives. She watches from hiding as they execute one in gruesome fashion. She then rescues the other, and the two fight off the men with the aid of her flintlock. She names her new companion Friday, as that was the day of her rescue. The two women become friends. Robin teaches Friday some words.

In December, Royal Navy officer Jonathan washes ashore after a storm sinks his ship. Robin's experiences with lecherous sailors and her cruel father have embittered her against men, and she is hostile and suspicious at first. When Jonathan learns that she is repairing a longboat that can hold only two, he suggests that the "fittest" take it and send help back for Friday. Robin, however, insists she and Friday will use the boat. Eventually, Robin overcomes her prejudice against him, and they spend the night together.

The next morning, she awakens to find he has stolen the longboat and is sailing away. When he returns, she assumes he is a coward, and sets out to kill him. He informs her that he turned back for her. Before she can shoot him, however, the savages return and capture Friday. Robin and Jonathan rescue her, but are surrounded. When all seems lost, Robin admits she wants to marry Jonathan. Just then, a warship appears and bombards the attackers, enabling the trio to steal an outrigger canoe and reach the safety of the ship.

Cast
 Amanda Blake as Miss Robin Crusoe
 George Nader as Jonathan  
 Rosalind Hayes as Friday

Production
Miss Robin Crusoe had the working title "Miss Robinson Crusoe". When producer Eugene Franke attempted to register that title with the Motion Picture Registration Bureau, there were objections raised by Óscar Danciger, who had recently completed a film called Robinson Crusoe in Mexico, and M-G-M, which was planning a film to be called "Robinson Crusoe" starring Spencer Tracy.  The MPRB decided in September 1953 that Franke could use either "Miss Robin Crusoe" or "Miss Robinson Crusoe".  Danciger re-titled his film Adventures of Robinson Crusoe.

The director originally slated to helm the film was E. A. Dupont.

Production of the film – which was shot in Pathécolor – ended October 14, 1952 at Samuel Goldwyn Studios. Location shooting took place in Palos Verdes, California, in the Los Angeles metropolitan area.

Although Miss Robin Crusoe was a low-budget film, its score is by the noted film composer Elmer Bernstein, who, like many others in Hollywood during the witch hunt for Communists by the House Un-American Activities Committee, found it hard to get work.  Bernstein had not been blacklisted, but had been what he referred to as "graylisted", saying "I wasn't one of the big wheels of the Communist Party or anything, but I'd done enough left-wing things that between about 1953 and 1955, the major studios would have been very loath to employ me." Bernstein was forced to take work that he would not have previously accepted, such as this film, as well as others such as Robot Monster and Cat-Women of the Moon.

Critical response
The film was not well received. Critic Win Fanning wrote in the Pittsburgh Post-Gazette: "As it is quite impossible to believe that a number of grown men and women could seriously go about the making of a movie called Miss Robin Crusoe, it must be assumed some sort of joke is intended. It isn't a very good joke, but it has its moments of hilarity."

References

External links 
 
 
 
 

1953 films
American adventure drama films
Films based on Robinson Crusoe
Films about survivors of seafaring accidents or incidents
1953 adventure films
20th Century Fox films
1950s English-language films
Films directed by Eugene Frenke
1950s American films